The Natuna Sea is an extensive shallow sea located around the Natuna Regency, extending south of the Riau Islands, east of the Lingga Regency and west of Borneo, to the Bangka Belitung Islands.  The islands of the Badas and Tambelan Archipelago are located at its center.  Mostly located within Indonesian territorial waters, it is the southernmost portion of the South China Sea, and geologically part of Sunda Shelf.  It communicates with the Java Sea to its southeast via the Karimata and Gaspar Strait east and west of Belitung, and with the Strait of Malacca to the west via the Berhala and Singapore Strait.

The International Hydrographic Organization (IHO), in its Limits of Oceans and Seas, 3rd edition (1953), does not list a Natuna Sea. Instead, the area encompassed by the Natuna Sea is considered the southern portion of the South China Sea. The 1986 draft of the IHO's Limits of Oceans and Seas proposed the Natuna Sea, which extends south from the Natuna and Anambas Islands to the Belitung Islands. However, the 1986 draft edition was never approved.

Extent
The Anambas and Natuna Islands comprise an island arc that connects the southeastern tip of the Malay peninsula to the western tip of Borneo. This creates the northern boundary of Natuna Sea. On the south, the southeast coast of Sumatra, the Lingga Islands, Bangka and Belitung islands creates its southern boundary and its opening to the Karimata Strait and Java Sea.

Geography
Just like the South China Sea, the Natuna Sea is a marginal part of the Pacific Ocean.
The Natuna sea contains several archipelagos, including:
 The Natuna Islands in Natuna Regency
 Greater Natuna Archipelago in Natuna Regency
 South Natuna Archipelago in Natuna Regency
 Anambas Archipelago in Anambas Islands Regency
 Lingga Archipelago in Lingga Regency
 Tambelan Archipelago in Bintan Regency
 Riau Archipelago
All of these archipelagos are administrated within Riau Islands province.

North Natuna Sea

In July 2017, Indonesia renamed the northern reaches of its exclusive economic zone in the South China Sea as the "North Natuna Sea", which is located north of the Indonesian Natuna Regency, bordering southern Vietnam's exclusive economic zone. The North Natuna Sea is located between the Natuna Islands and Cape Cà Mau on the southern tip of the Mekong Delta in Vietnam.

See also
 West Philippine Sea

References

Natuna Regency
Seas of Indonesia
Marginal seas of the Pacific Ocean
Maritime Southeast Asia